Crocodile Hunters is 1949 documentary directed by Lee Robinson about both aboriginal and professional crocodile hunters in the Northern Territory. The film has since been used as a study text for Australian secondary schools.

References

External links

Crocodile Hunters at National Film and Sound Archive
Complete Copy of film at National Film and Sound Archive YouTube Channel

1949 films
Australian documentary films
1949 documentary films
Australian black-and-white films
1940s English-language films